Marlbed is a locality in the Shire of Buloke, Victoria, Australia. Marlbed post office opened on 1 August 1888, was renamed Jil Jil on 1 May 1911 and was closed on 31 January 1943.

References